Germain's langur (Trachypithecus germaini) is a lutung native to Thailand, Burma, Cambodia, Laos and Vietnam. The Old World monkey was previously included in Trachypithecus cristatus and Trachypithecus villosus.

Two subspecies were recognized:
Trachypithecus germaini germaini
Trachypithecus germaini caudalis

Taxonomy and evolution 
Germain's langur is part of the leaf monkey subfamily Colobinae. Two subspecies of the Germain's langur are recognized: Trachypithecus germaini germaini and Trachypithecus germaini caudalis. However, the classification of the Germain's langur has been contested, with T. germaini being grouped with other species in its subfamily. T. germaini and T. margarita were considered to be a single species, T. villosus, but morphological and genetic evidence has shown that they are distinct. T. germaini has also been grouped with T. cristatus until recent reclassifications.

T. germaini goes by several common names such as the Indochinese lutung, Germain’s langur, Germain’s silver langur, Indochinese leaf monkey, and Indochinese silvered langur.

Description 
Germain's langur has black colouration on its hands and feet, as well as the upper part of its body which fades into paler grey on its underparts. They have long grey tails and white hairs on its round face. Their young have bright orange fur.

Distribution and habitat 
The limits of the distribution of Germain's langur are not well known, but they are currently found in Asia, specifically Cambodia, Vietnam, Lao PDR, Myanmar, and Thailand. Populations in Vietnam are severely reduced, with few sightings in the last 50 years. In Lao PDR, the species has no continuous range, rather multiple patches of higher relative abundance. Its distribution in Cambodia is widespread, but its abundance will vary from common to rare. One of the few sites with a population estimate is Keo Seima Wildlife Sanctuary where a stable population of 1487 is reported. In Thailand, the species is common, with many protected areas supporting large populations. Germain's langur is a terrestrial arboreal species, often found in lowlands. They prefer evergreen and semi-evergreen, riverine, mixed deciduous, and gallery forests. They are not commonly found at high elevations or hilly areas.

Behaviour 
The diet of Germain's langur is folivorous consisting of leaves, shoots, and fruits. This diet dictates a resting period, in which they can undergo the process of rumination.   

T. germaini, and other Asian colobines, are generally less frequently engaged in social interaction than frugivorous primates such as macaques. They have a lower affinity to social behaviour in comparison to feeding and resting which makes up the majority of their day. However, T. germaini is often found in troops of 10 to 50 individuals in close social proximity.

Predators and threats 
Predators of lutungs, including the Germain's langur, include leopards, tigers, dholes, and large snakes. A variety of small carnivores will feed on lutung young.

Prevalent threats to Germain's langur include hunting, exotic pet trading, and habitat loss due to agricultural expansion.

Status and conservation 
T. germaini is considered endangered by the IUCN, with a greater than 50% decline in the past three generations. It is listed under CITES Appendix II, meaning that trade of the species must be controlled to avoid endangerment.

Little conservation efforts have been made, despite the species designation. Several protected areas have been established across its range which aids in the conservation of the species. The species has been recorded in numerous protected areas in Vietnam and Thailand. In Vietnam, their populations have increased in two protected areas, Phú Quốc National Park and Kiên Lương Karst Area, demonstrating the importance of conservation efforts.

References 

Germain's langur
Primates of Southeast Asia
Mammals of Thailand
Mammals of Myanmar
Mammals of Cambodia
Mammals of Laos
Mammals of Vietnam
Endangered fauna of Asia
Germain's langur
Taxa named by Alphonse Milne-Edwards